Doudou Touré (born December 29, 1991) is a Mauritanian footballer.

Career

Youth
Touré grew up in Nouakchott, before moving to the United States in 1998, settling with his family in Atlanta, Georgia. He attended Joseph Wheeler High School, played junior club soccer with Alpharetta United and Atlanta Fire United.

Professional
Touré turned professional in 2008, playing with the B team of Mexican side Monterrey. He trialed with Major League Soccer's FC Dallas in April 2008, and was set to sign for the team, but the transaction fell through.

Attended trials with Columbus Crew and the Vancouver Whitecaps in April 2010. He signed a contract with the Whitecaps on May 10, 2010, and spent some time playing with the Vancouver Whitecaps Residency team in the USL Premier Development League, before making his Whitecaps debut on May 26, 2010, in a 2010 Canadian Championship game against Montreal Impact.

Personal life
Doudou's younger brother, Alhagi Touré, played college soccer at George Mason University before transferring to Clayton State University.

References

External links
 Vancouver Whitecaps Premier bio
 SMWW Sports Agency

1991 births
Association football forwards
C.F. Monterrey players
Primera B de Chile players
Expatriate footballers in Chile
Expatriate footballers in Mexico
Expatriate soccer players in Canada
Living people
Mauritanian expatriate footballers
Mauritanian footballers
San Luis de Quillota footballers
USL League Two players
USSF Division 2 Professional League players
Vancouver Whitecaps (1986–2010) players
Vancouver Whitecaps FC U-23 players
Vancouver Whitecaps Residency players
People from Rosso
Mauritanian expatriate sportspeople in Chile
Mauritanian expatriate sportspeople in Canada
Mauritanian expatriate sportspeople in Mexico
Vancouver Whitecaps FC players